Jamie Hamilton (born 1 March 2002) is a Scottish professional footballer who plays for Hamilton Academical, as a defender.

Club career
Hamilton began his career with Hamilton Academical. In November 2019 he signed a new contract with Hamilton, until summer 2022. In November 2021 he was hospitalised with chest pains. In March 2022 he spoke about the club's form and play-off ambitions. In April 2022 he was linked with a move away from the club. In August 2022 he signed a contract extension until 2023, and in September he was expected to return to first-team action in October.

International career
He has represented Scotland at under-16,  under-17 and under-18 youth levels. In August 2019 he represented Scotland in the under-19 squad.

References

2002 births
Living people
Scottish footballers
People from Newton Mearns
Sportspeople from East Renfrewshire
Hamilton Academical F.C. players
Association football defenders
Scotland youth international footballers
Scottish Professional Football League players